Terry John Thompson (born August 7, 1971 in Omaha, Nebraska) is an American jockey in Thoroughbred horse racing who, as at December 8, 2011, has won 2781 races during his career that began in 1993 at Turfway Park in Florence, Kentucky.

On May 20, 2002, Terry Thompson set a Prairie Meadows Racetrack record when he rode six winners on a single racecard. He was the existing co-holder of the record with five wins. At the same racetrack, he won four straight riding titles between 2000 and 2003 before breaking a leg in 2004. He returned to win three more titles consecutively between 2007 and 2009. Thompson also won back-to-back riding titles at Oaklawn Park in 2009 and 2010.

Year-end charts

References

1971 births
Living people
American jockeys
Sportspeople from Omaha, Nebraska